Melody Maker was a British weekly pop music newspaper which was published between 1926 and 2000. Melody Maker was the third publication (after NME, or New Musical Express, in 1952, and Record Mirror in 1955) to publish a weekly record chart. NME is now regarded as the "canonical" source for record charts by the Official Charts Company in the period up to 10 March 1960; after that, when Record Retailer began compiling a chart, the Official Charts Company and Guinness' British Hit Singles & Albums cited them as the canonical source for the British singles chart. Prior to 15 February 1969, when the British Market Research Bureau (BMRB) chart was established as part of a joint commission by Record Retailer and the BBC, there was no one universally accepted or official source and many periodicals compiled their own chart.

By the 1980s, NME and Melody Maker had the last surviving independently compiled charts in the UK, Record Mirror having ended its own chart in 1962, Disc & Music Echo likewise in 1967, and the short-lived Top Pops/Music Now folding in 1971. Melody Maker was the first to throw in the towel, publishing its last independently compiled chart on 4 June 1988, with NME publishing its last the next week on 11 June 1988. In the respective following weeks, both began publishing Market Research Information Bureau chart.

Notable differences when compared to the official chart run by BMRB and, later, Gallup, and even NME are additional number-one singles in the decade for Rick Astley, Adam and the Ants, The Police, Shakin' Stevens, David Bowie, Frankie Goes to Hollywood and Phil Collins. Significantly, Tears for Fears' song "Everybody Wants to Rule the World" spent four weeks at the top of the Melody Maker chart (and three weeks on the NME chart) although it never topped the Gallup chart. Additionally, as well as making number one on the Melody Maker and NME charts and not the official chart, a-ha's "Take On Me" and Ultravox's "Vienna" were also in the top five best-selling singles of their year. Thirty-two acts achieved a number-one single on the Melody Maker chart (more than NME) but never had an official number-one single although two of these had songs they had written reach number one when performed by another artist.

Number-one singles

Notes

References
Footnotes

Lists of number-one songs in the United Kingdom
1980s in British music